Leonidas Flores Reyes (born 24 January 1965) is a retired Costa Rican professional footballer.

He played for Puntarenas, Saprissa, Guanacasteca and San Carlos.

Club career
Born in La Palma de Abangares, Guanacaste, Flores started his career at Puntarenas in 1983 and won the 1986 Primera Division de Costa Rica title with them. He is also the club's all-time leading scorer with 93 goals and scored a total of 118 career goals, placed in position 17th all time Costa Rican strikers. He was the league's top goalscorer in 1986 with 19 goals.

He had a three-year spell abroad, at Canadian Soccer League side Montreal Supra.

International career
Flores made 30 appearances for the Costa Rica national football team from 1984 to 1996. He also played at the 1984 Olympic Games in two games as sub.

Flores scored two goals as Costa Rica won the 1989 CONCACAF Championship, besides having his best performance, was left out from the Italy 1990 World Cup roster. According to Flores, he has never been explained why.
Finally was able to return for the 1991 UNCAF Nations Cup and 1991 CONCACAF Gold Cup.

His final international was a September 1996 friendly match against Costa Rica.

Retirement
After his football career he became a traffic policeman in Guanacaste.
In September 2012, Flores was arrested on suspicion of charging "bribes" to drivers in exchange for not fining them for violating the traffic law.

Personal life
He is married to Iris Ocampos.

References

External links
 

1965 births
Living people
People from Guanacaste Province
Association football forwards
Costa Rican footballers
Costa Rica international footballers
Olympic footballers of Costa Rica
Footballers at the 1984 Summer Olympics
Puntarenas F.C. players
Deportivo Saprissa players
Montreal Supra players
A.D. San Carlos footballers
Costa Rican expatriate footballers
Expatriate soccer players in Canada
Costa Rican expatriate sportspeople in Canada
Canadian Soccer League (1987–1992) players
Costa Rican police officers
1991 CONCACAF Gold Cup players
Copa Centroamericana-winning players
CONCACAF Championship-winning players